Duncan John Maskell,  (born 30 May 1961) is a British biochemist and academic, who specialises in molecular microbiology and bacterial infectious diseases. Since 2018, he has been Vice-Chancellor of the University of Melbourne, Australia. He previously taught at the University of Cambridge, England.

Early life and education
Maskell grew up in north London, in a working-class household. He was educated at Queen Elizabeth's School for Boys, then a comprehensive school in Barnet. At 11, he performed at the Queen Elizabeth Hall in London, to celebrate the 60th birthday of the composer Benjamin Britten, and has played and performed music in several bands.

He was the first in his family to go to university. He studied Natural Sciences at Gonville and Caius College, Cambridge, graduating with a Bachelor of Arts (BA) degree. He undertook a Doctor of Philosophy (PhD) degree in Cambridge's Department of Pathology on Salmonella infections and graduated in 1986. His doctoral thesis was titled "Mechanisms of resistance and immunity to salmonella infections" and was submitted in 1985.

Career
After doctoral work, Maskell worked as a research scientist for Wellcome Biotech from 1985 to 1988, then as a research fellow at the Institute of Molecular Medicine, University of Oxford, from 1988 to 1992. In 1992, he joined Imperial College, London as a lecturer in its Department of Biochemistry.

In 1996, he appointed Marks & Spencer Professor of Farm Animal Health, Food Science and Food Safety at the University of Cambridge. He was elected a fellow of Wolfson College, Cambridge in 1998. He also served as Head of the Department of Veterinary Medicine from 2004 to 2013, and Head of the School of Biological Sciences from 2013 to 2015, and the university's Senior Pro-Vice Chancellor from 2015 to 2018.

In October 2017, it was announced that Maskell would be the next Vice-Chancellor of the University of Melbourne, succeeding Glyn Davis. He took up the role on 1 October 2018. In May 2022, Maskell was reappointed for a second term.

The COVID-19 pandemic of 2020 saw severe lockdown measures and travel bans in Melbourne from March–November, meaning the university was particularly hard hit because of its reliance on international student revenues. Maskell announced widespread staff redundancies and early retirement schemes (450 people) to reduce university expenditure against a forecast drop in student numbers, in August 2020.

Honours
In 2011, Maskell was elected a Fellow of the Academy of Medical Sciences (FMedSci).

Selected works

  
  
 
 
  
 Mastroeni, P. and D. Maskell (eds.). 2006. Salmonella infections: clinical, immunological, and molecular aspects. Cambridge: Cambridge University Press.

References

 

1961 births
Living people
British biochemists
British molecular biologists
English bacteriologists
Fellows of Wolfson College, Cambridge
Fellows of the Academy of Medical Sciences (United Kingdom)
Vice-Chancellors of the University of Melbourne
People educated at Queen Elizabeth's Grammar School for Boys
Alumni of Gonville and Caius College, Cambridge